Evelyn Foster Morneweck (1887-1973) was a writer and biographer of Stephen Collins Foster. Her father, Morrison Foster, was also a biographer and published another biography of Stephen's. Her biographical account of Stephen Collins Foster and other family members can be accessed online.

References

External links
Photos of Morneweck

Burials at Allegheny Cemetery
20th-century American biographers
American women biographers
1887 births
1973 deaths
20th-century American women writers